Hebron is the name of several unincorporated communities in the U.S. state of West Virginia.

Hebron, Marion County, West Virginia
Hebron, Pleasants County, West Virginia